In classical music from Western culture, a diminished sixth is an interval produced by narrowing a minor sixth by a chromatic semitone. For example, the interval from A to F is a minor sixth, eight semitones wide, and both the intervals from A to F, and from A to F are diminished sixths, spanning seven semitones. Being diminished, it is considered a dissonant interval, despite being equivalent to an interval known for its consonance.

Its inversion is the augmented third, and its enharmonic equivalent is the perfect fifth.

Wolf fifth 

A severely dissonant diminished sixth is observed when the instrument is tuned using a Pythagorean or a meantone temperament tuning system. Typically, this is the interval between G and E. Since it seems to howl like a wolf (because of the beating), and since it is meant to be the enharmonic equivalent to a fifth, this interval is called the wolf fifth. Notice that a justly tuned fifth is the most consonant interval after the perfect unison and the perfect octave.

References

Diminished intervals
Sixths (music)